Justice Ray may refer to:

C. L. Ray Jr. (1931–2018), associate justice of the Texas Supreme Court
Charles Ray (Indiana judge) (1829–1912), associate justice of the Indiana Supreme Court
Robert D. Ray (Missouri judge) (1817–1891), associate justice of the Supreme Court of Missouri